The following is a list of Silesian-language films. After World War II quite a number of feature films was shot in Silesian or with an extensive use of Silesian, alongside dialogs in Polish, German and Czech. The vast majority of such films were produced in Poland, and some in Czechoslovakia and the Czech Republic.

List

1969
 Salt of the Black Earth by Kazimierz Kutz

1971
 Pearl in the Crown by Kazimierz Kutz

1979
 Paciorki jednego różańca [The Beads of One Rosary] by Kazimierz Kutz

1980
 Grzeszny żywot Franciszka Buły [The Sinful Life of Franciszek Bula] by Janusz Kidawa

1983
 Na straży swej stać będę [I shall Always Stand Guard] by Kazimierz Kutz

1984
 Trzy stopy nad ziemią [Three Feet Above the Ground] by Jan Kidawa-Błoński

1986
 Komedianci z wczorajszej ulicy [Pretenders from Yesterday's Street] by Janusz Kidawa

1987
 Sławna jak Sarajewo [Famous Like Sarajevo] by Janusz Kidawa

1992
 Pamiętnik znaleziony w garbie [Diary in a Marble / Memoirs Found in a Hunched Back] by Jan Kidawa-Błoński

1993
 Gorący czwartek by Michał Rosa

1994
 Reverted  by Kazimierz Kutz
 Śmierć jak kromka chleba [Death as a Slice of Bread] by Kazimierz Kutz
 Stanika Cyronia droga do nieba by Wojciech Sarnowicz
 Wesoło czyli smutno. Kazimierza Kutza rozmowy o Górnym Śląsku (TV series: interviews, 22 parts, 1994–1997) by Kazimierz Kutz

1995
 ...i twoja mowa cię zdradza by Wojciech Sarnowicz

1999
 Końca wojny nie było by Wojciech Sarnowicz
 Posłuchajcie przypowieści o życiu szczęśliwym by Wojciech Sarnowicz
 Święta wojna (TV series: comedy, 322 parts, 1999–2008) by Marek Bielecki and Dariusz Goczał

2001
 Angelus by Lech Majewski

2005
 Barbórka by :pl:Maciej Pieprzyca
 Destined for Blues by Jan Kidawa-Błoński

2007
 Benek by Robert Gliński

2009
 Zgorszenia publiczne by Maciej Prykowski

2010
 Ewa by Adam Sikora and Ingmar Villqist

2016
 Szczęście świata by Michał Rosa

2017 
 Gwiazdy [Stars] by Jan Kidawa-Błoński
 Zgoda [The Reconciliation] by Maciej Sobieszczański

See also 
 Silesian language
 Silesian German
 Texas Silesian

References

Languages of Germany
Languages of Poland
Languages of Slovakia
Languages of the Czech Republic
Silesian
Polish language
Silesian language